The 1932 Clemson Tigers football team was an American football team that represented Clemson College in the Southern Conference during the 1932 college football season. In their second season under head coach Jess Neely, the Tigers compiled a 3–5–1 record (0–4 against conference opponents), finished last in the conference, and was outscored by a total of 111 to 89.

Bob Miller was the team captain. Two Clemson players were selected as first-team players on the 1932 All-Southern Conference football team: back Henry Woodward and guard John Heinemann.

Schedule

References

Clemson
Clemson Tigers football seasons
Clemson Tigers football